Ian Haley is a South African field hockey player.  At the 2012 Summer Olympics, he competed for the national team in the men's tournament.

References

External links

Living people
South African people of British descent
South African male field hockey players
Field hockey players at the 2012 Summer Olympics
Olympic field hockey players of South Africa
Year of birth missing (living people)
2010 Men's Hockey World Cup players